Bindawa is a Local Government Area in Katsina State, Nigeria. Its headquarters are in the town of Bindawa, at.

It has an area of 398 km and a population of 152,356 at the 2006 census.

It has two district heads from Bindawa and Doro: Dan-Yusufan Katsina and Dan-Barhim Katsina.

Schools in the area include: 
 Government Science Secondary School, Bindawa
 Government Day Secondary School, Bindawa
 Government Day Secondary School, Doro
Bindawa Model Primary School
 Doro Model Primary School
 Madarasatul Tartilul Qur'an Islamiyya, Doro
 Madarasatul Ulumuddeeni Islamiyya, Doro
 Diyaul Quran Islamic School, Bindawa
 Luwa'urrahaman Islamiyya School, Bindawa.
 Tahfizul Qur'an Islamiyya School, Bindawa
Government Day Secondary School, Tama
Madarasatul Tarbiyyatul Auladul Islamiyya, Tama.
Government Day Secondary School, Giremawa.
Government Day Secondary School, Yangora.

The postal code of the area is 822.

References

Local Government Areas in Katsina State